Astialakwa (Towa: Walatowa, Navajo: Mąʼii Deeshgiizh) was a prehistoric and historic village built by the ancestral Puebloan people located within the Astialakwa Archeological District (FS-360, LA-1825), in an area now known as the Jemez Springs area of Northern New Mexico. The archeological area is on the National Register of Historic Places (ID# 84003010).

Description
Astialakwa was a fortified pueblo village near Jemez Pueblo in the area that is now New Mexico. The village was built at the top of a nearly inaccessible ridge on an 800-foot high detached mesa (peñol), overlooking the Jemez creek. The people who lived in these villages spoke the Towa language, a Tanoan language.
Astialaka shares architectural similarities with the former pueblos of Patokwa and Boletsakwa which were centered on two large linear plazas surrounded by multiple rooms built in the characteristic "ladder-type" construction. Astialakwa differed in that there were no kivas, and the one-story walls were built of unhewn tuff blocks. The complex architectural remains indicate that this was a habitation as well as a refuge pueblo, containing many rooms, petroglyphs and other rock art, defensive walls, and agricultural areas.  The periods of significance were 1500-1599 and between 1600 and 1649.

History

Historically, the Jemez people lived in seven or more pueblos before the conquest of Santa Fe de Nuevo Méjico in 1598 by Juan Oñate and his men. The Spaniards built missions and forced the Jemez people to abandon their historic homes and move to three settlements with missions: Astialakwa, Gyusiwa and Patoqua (Patokwa). In 1692, don Diego de Vargas reconquered Nuevo Mexico and in 1694 stormed the fortress of Astialakwa in a siege.

Battle of Astialakwa
The Battle of Astialakwa (also known as the Siege of Astialakwa) took place on July 24, 1694, when  a group of 120 soldiers led by the Spanish governor don Diego de Vargas and their Keresan-speaking allied militia from the Zia, Santa Ana and San Felipe pueblos, waged war against the Jemez Pueblo indigenous peoples. Eighty-four Jemez people died in the battle, while 81 people escaped. Over three hundred and sixty Native women and children were taken prisoner by the Spanish soldiers. Seven people leapt to their death instead of being captured. After the battle, Vargas ordered the village to be “burned and reduced to ashes” after giving the sheep, goats, cattle and maize to his Keres allies.

The battle was in part retaliation for the Pueblo Revolt, when over 30 Pueblo villages made up of peoples speaking six languages banded together in a unified uprising against the Spanish colonialist forces; culminating in the death of 401 Spanish on August 10, 1680.

Descendants of the survivors of Astialakwa continue to dwell and share their culture at Jemez Pueblo not far from Guadalupe Mesa.

Gallery
Astialakwa Archeological District is located near Jemez Pueblo, NM, USA. Access to the site is restricted.

See also
 Ancestral Puebloan dwellings
 Pueblo
 Ancestral Pueblo people
 Tanoan languages

References

Further reading
Cordell, Linda S. Before Pecos: Settlement Aggregation at Rowe, New Mexico. Maxwell Museum of Anthropology Anthropologica Papers No. 6. University of New Mexico Press, Albuquerque. 1998

Creamer, Winifred. The Architecture of Arroyo Hondo Pueblo, New Mexico. Arroyo Hondo Archaeological Series 7. 1993

Kidder, Alfred Vincent. Pecos, New Mexico: Archaeological Notes. Papers of the Peabody Foundation for Archaeology 5. Phillips Academy, Andover. 1958

LeBlanc, Steven A. Prehistoric Warfare in the American Southwest. University of Utah Press, Salt Lake City. 1999

Noel Hume, Ivor. Archaeology: Handmaiden to History. North Carolina Historical Review Volume 41, No.2), pages 214-225. 1964

Sando, Joe S. Pueblo Nations: Eight Centuries of Pueblo Indian History. Clear Light Publishers, Santa Fe, pages 297. 1998

Ancestral Puebloans
Former populated places in New Mexico
Archaeology
Ruins
Historical regions